Bishop Philip Abbas Ghaboush was a Sudanese Bishop and politician. He was born in Sudan in 1922 and died in London in 2008  at the age of 86. He used both politics and religion as strength to struggle for his  Nuba people.for almost five decades. HE was born in Omdurman and he descends from the Ama people of Nuba Mountain of Southern Kordufan.

References

1922 births
2008 deaths
Sudanese politicians
Sudanese religious leaders
People from Omdurman